Abderrahmane Sissako (born 13 October 1961) is a Mauritanian-born Malian film director and producer. His film Waiting for Happiness (Heremakono) was screened at the 2002 Cannes Film Festival official selection under Un Certain Regard, winning a FIPRESCI Prize. His 2006 film Bamako received much attention. Sissako's themes include globalisation, exile and the displacement of people. His 2014 film Timbuktu was selected to compete for the Palme d'Or in the main competition section at the 2014 Cannes Film Festival and nominated for an Academy Award for Best Foreign Language Film.

Biography 
Soon after his birth Sissako's family emigrated to Mali, his father's country, where he completed part of his primary and secondary education. Sissako returned briefly to Mauritania, his mother's land, in 1980. Then he left for Moscow, where he studied cinema at the VGIK (Federal State Film Institute) from 1983 to 1989. Sissako settled in France at the beginning of the 1990s.

Besides his work as a director, he also worked as a cultural Advisor for former head of state Mohamed Ould Abdel Aziz.

Sissako is married to the Ethiopian film director Maji-da Abdi.

Filmography

Jury 
In addition to feature films and short films, Sissako has served on the jury of the Premiers Plans festival in Angers in January 2007.

2000: 53rd Cannes International Film Festival (jury member, Cinéfondation and short films section)
2003: 56th Cannes International Film Festival (jury president, Un Certain Regard section)
2014: 36th Moscow International Film Festival (jury member, main competition section)
2015: 68th Cannes International Film Festival (jury president, Cinéfondation and short films section)

Bibliography
Thomas Sotinel, « Abderrahmane Sissako. Pour en finir avec le cinéma du Nord », Le Monde, 21 octobre 2006, p. 19
Samuel Lelièvre, « Les cinémas africains, Abderrahmane Sissako et les frontières du monde », CinémAction, no. 137, 2010, pp. 182–185.

References

External links 
 
 Interview: Abderrahmane Sissako with Kwame Anthony Appiah
 Sight and Sound, Film of the Month: Bamako
 A Fragmented Epistemology: The Films of Abderrahmane Sissako
 Sissako YouTube Interview, 2007

Mauritanian film directors
Mauritanian film producers
1961 births
Living people
Mauritanian people of Malian descent
Best Director Lumières Award winners
Best Director César Award winners